The men's 100 metres was an event at the 1960 Summer Olympics in Rome, Italy. The competition was held at the Olympic Stadium on 31 August and 1 September. Sixty-five competitors from 48 nations entered, but 61 competitors from 45 nations participated. Nations were limited to three athletes each under rules set at the 1930 Olympic Congress. The event was won by Armin Hary of the United Team of Germany, breaking the United States's streak of five straight wins and earning the first Olympic title by a German runner in the event (Fritz Hofmann had taken second in 1896).

Summary
Since winning the 1958 European Championship, Armin Hary was a known commodity.  His incredible reaction time supposedly had been clocked using high speed cameras at .03 of a second, while normal humans react from .15 upward.  Some of his competitors thought he was using some sort of trickery.

Along with Enrique Figuerola asking for a pause, the proceedings to start this 10 second race took 20 minutes. Hary's incredible reaction to the gun and sprint form through the acceleration phase has been studied for generations, needless to say it put him in the lead, on the outside of the track in lane 6, putting nearly a 2-metre gap on Peter Radford to his inside. Dave Sime was the slowest out of the blocks with a deficit to make up across the track from Hary in lane 1.  But make up the deficit he did, gaining with every step, passing the field by 70 metres and gaining until he was virtually running stride for stride against Hary at the line.  Hary held Sime off, leaning at the tape to take the gold.  With the fastest closing speed over the last 20 metres, Radford made up a big gap, to take the slight edge over Figueola and Frank Budd all finishing together.

Later, as a professor of sports science, Radford said he thinks he figured out the "tell" Hary used to anticipate the gun.

Hary ran representing the United Team of Germany, a combined team of German athletes from East and West Germany.

Background

This was the fourteenth time the event was held, having appeared at every Olympics since the first in 1896. Manfred Germar, 5th place in 1956, was the only finalist from the Melbourne Games to return in 1960. Notable entrants, along with Hary and Germar, were Americans Ray Norton (U.S. Olympic trial champion), Dave Sime, and Frank Budd, and Canada's Harry Jerome (who shared the world record with Hary at 10 seconds flat).

The British West Indies, Fiji, Kenya, Morocco, South Korea, and Sudan were represented in the event for the first time. The United States was the only nation to have appeared at each of the first fourteen Olympic men's 100 metres events.

Competition format

The event retained the same basic four round format from 1920–1956: heats, quarterfinals, semifinals, and a final. However, the format was tweaked for the first time since 1936. The number of heats was reduced from 12 to 9 (with six or seven athletes per heat), with the number of runners advancing from each heat increased from 2 to 3. This led to 27 quarterfinalists (up from 24), so the 4 quarterfinal heats were now unbalanced: one had 6 athletes while the other three had 7. As before, however, the top 3 in each quarterfinal advanced to the semifinals. There were 2 heats of 6 semifinalists, once again with the top 3 advancing to the 6-man final.

Records

Prior to the competition, the existing World and Olympic records were as follows.

Armin Hary broke the 28-year-old Olympic record with a 10.2 second run in the quarterfinals. He (along with Dave Sime) matched that 10.2 second result in the final.

Results

Heats

The top three runners in each of the 9 heats advanced.

Heat 1

Heat 2

Heat 3

Heat 4

Heat 5

Heat 6

Heat 7

Heat 8

Heat 9

Quarterfinal

The top three runners in each of the four heats advanced to the semifinals.

Quarterfinal 1

Quarterfinal 2

Quarterfinal 3

Quarterfinal 4

Semifinals

The top three runners in each of the two semifinals advanced to the final.

Semifinal 1

Semifinal 2

Final

Armin Hary and Dave Sime tied the Olympic record.

Wind speed = -0.0 m/s

References

External links
Olympic Report 1960 Volume 2

M
100 metres at the Olympics
Men's events at the 1960 Summer Olympics